Mattias Käit (born 29 June 1998) is an Estonian professional footballer who plays as an attacking midfielder for Liga I club Rapid București and the Estonia national team.

Club career

Fulham
Käit joined the Levadia youth academy in 2006, when Levadia and Kotkas  merged. In July 2014, he joined Fulham academy. Käit signed his first professional contract with the club in July 2015. On 1 March 2017, he signed a contract extension which would keep him at Fulham until the summer of 2019.

Ross County (loan)
On 31 January 2018, Käit joined Scottish Premiership club Ross County on loan until the end of the season. He made his debut for the club on 3 February 2018, in a 4–1 away win over Dundee.

Domžale
On 16 June 2019, Käit signed a three-year contract with Slovenian PrvaLiga side Domžale. He made his debut for the club on 11 July 2019, in a 4–3 away win against Balzan in the first qualifying round of the UEFA Europa League. Käit left the club on 3 September 2021.

Bodø/Glimt
On 16 September 2021, Käit signed a contract with Norwegian champions Bodø/Glimt until the end of the year.

Rapid București
On 18 January 2022, Käit signed a two-and-a-half year contract with Romanian club Rapid București until the summer of 2024.

International career
Käit has represented Estonia at under-16, under-17, under-19, under-21 and under-23 levels.

He made his senior international debut for Estonia on 6 January 2016, in a 1–1 draw against Sweden in a friendly. Käit scored his first two international goals for Estonia on 7 October 2016, in a 4–0 home victory over Gibraltar in a qualification match for the 2018 FIFA World Cup. On 3 September 2017, Käit scored the only goal of a home win over Cyprus in injury time. The goal later earned him the Estonian Silverball award for the best goal scored for the national team in 2017. He scored again in the successive qualifier on 7 October, a 6–0 away win over Gibraltar. Käit was Estonia's highest goalscorer in the qualification with four goals.

Career statistics

Club

International

Scores and results list Estonia's goal tally first, score column indicates score after each Käit goal.

Honours
Bodø/Glimt
Eliteserien: 2021

Estonia
Baltic Cup: 2020

Individual
Estonian Young Footballer of the Year: 2016, 2017
Estonian Silverball: 2017, 2021

References

External links

1998 births
Living people
Footballers from Tallinn
Estonian footballers
Estonia youth international footballers
Estonia under-21 international footballers
Estonia international footballers
Estonian expatriate footballers
Association football midfielders
FCI Levadia Tallinn players
Fulham F.C. players
Ross County F.C. players
NK Domžale players
FK Bodø/Glimt players
FC Rapid București players
Scottish Professional Football League players
Slovenian PrvaLiga players
Liga I players
Expatriate footballers in England
Expatriate footballers in Scotland
Expatriate footballers in Slovenia
Expatriate footballers in Norway
Expatriate footballers in Romania
Estonian expatriate sportspeople in England
Estonian expatriate sportspeople in Scotland
Estonian expatriate sportspeople in Slovenia
Estonian expatriate sportspeople in Norway
Estonian expatriate sportspeople in Romania